Michael Kohlmann and Alexander Peya were the defending champions but decided not to participate.
Scott Lipsky and Rajeev Ram won the title, defeating Sanchai Ratiwatana and Sonchat Ratiwatana 6–7(2), 6–4, [10–4] in the finals.

Seeds

Draw

Draw

External links
 Main Draw

Bauer Watertechnology Cup - Doubles
2010 Doubles